The snooty wrasse (Cheilinus oxycephalus), also known as the red maori wrasse, is a species of marine ray-finned fish from the family Labridae, the wrasses. It is a widespread Indo-Pacific reef fish.

References

Snooty wrasse
Fish described in 1853
Taxa named by Pieter Bleeker